Abigail Golda Hoffman,  (born February 11, 1947) is a Canadian former track and field athlete.

Hockey
Hoffman is Jewish, and was born in Toronto. She learned to skate when she was three. In the mid-1950s when she was nine, she wanted to play hockey but there weren't any existing leagues specifically for girls in the Toronto area. As a result her parents registered her in the local boy's league as "Ab Hoffman". Due to her age and the fact that Aby sported a short hair cut, she was not easy to distinguish from the boys. When it was discovered she was a girl, she was no longer allowed to play despite the fact that she had not yet reached the age of puberty. Her parents took the case to the Ontario Supreme Court and the story was covered by Time and Newsweek. She played for the St. Catharines Tee Pees, a boys' team in the newly formed Little Toronto Hockey League as a defenceman and was selected for an all-star charity game.

Track and field
After her experiences with hockey, Hoffman participated in competitive swimming and then realized she was particularly suited to track and field, specifically 800-metre running. She competed in four Olympic Games: (1964, 1968, 1972 and 1976), four Pan American Games and two Commonwealth Games and was Canada's flag-bearer at the 1976 Games in Montreal.

Hoffman competed in two summer Universiades in 1965 and 1967, where she took home a bronze medal and a silver medal respectively in the 800 metre event. She won the gold medal in the 880-yard event at the 1966 British Empire and Commonwealth Games.

She finished 7th in the 800 metres at the Mexico Olympics; and in the 1972 Munich games she was 8th in a historic women's 800 metre race in which the entire field but two broke the 2-minute barrier. Hoffman ran a 2:00.17 seconds; a Canadian record and personal best. She also won gold for the 800-metre race at the 1963 Pan American Games and 1971 Pan American Games and the bronze at the 1967, at the 1975 Games, a silver and a bronze for the 800-metre and the 1500-metre distances.

At the 1969 Maccabiah Games in Israel, she won the women's 800 m run.

Post-athletics
From 1981 to 1991, she was the first woman director general of Sport Canada, a federal government sports agency.  In 1981, she was the first Canadian woman elected to the Executive Committee of the Canadian Olympic Committee. From 1980 to 1982, she wrote a fitness column for the Canadian magazine, Chatelaine.

In 1982, she and Maureen McTeer, supported the first women's national championship in ice hockey (known as the Shopper's Drug Mart Women's Nationals). The Abby Hoffman Cup is named in her honour. Since 1995, she has been a council member of the International Association of Athletics Federations. In 2003, she was named senior advisor with Health Canada and is executive co-ordinator of Health Canada's pharmaceutical management strategies. She is currently the assistant deputy minister for the Strategic Policy Branch for Health Canada.

She is also the sister of Paul F. Hoffman, a geologist who has promoted the "snowball earth" hypothesis.

Honours
In 1982, Hoffman was made an officer of the Order of Canada. In 2004, she was inducted into Canada's Sports Hall of Fame. In 2007, she was inducted into the Jewish Canadian Athletes Hall of Fame.
In June 2015, she received an honorary Doctorate of Laws, from her alma mater, the University of Toronto.

References

External links
 1956 CBC Radio archives story about her
 CBC Television archives story about her
 
 
 
 

1947 births
Living people
Canadian female middle-distance runners
Athletes from Toronto
Jewish Canadian sportspeople
Olympic track and field athletes of Canada
Athletes (track and field) at the 1964 Summer Olympics
Athletes (track and field) at the 1968 Summer Olympics
Athletes (track and field) at the 1972 Summer Olympics
Athletes (track and field) at the 1976 Summer Olympics
Commonwealth Games gold medallists for Canada
Commonwealth Games medallists in athletics
Athletes (track and field) at the 1962 British Empire and Commonwealth Games
Athletes (track and field) at the 1966 British Empire and Commonwealth Games
Pan American Games medalists in athletics (track and field)
Athletes (track and field) at the 1963 Pan American Games
Athletes (track and field) at the 1967 Pan American Games
Athletes (track and field) at the 1971 Pan American Games
Athletes (track and field) at the 1975 Pan American Games
Officers of the Order of Canada
Jewish ice hockey players
Jewish female athletes (track and field)
Maccabiah Games gold medalists for Canada
Maccabiah Games medalists in athletics
Competitors at the 1969 Maccabiah Games
Canadian women's ice hockey players
Pan American Games gold medalists for Canada
Pan American Games silver medalists for Canada
Pan American Games bronze medalists for Canada
Universiade medalists in athletics (track and field)
Universiade silver medalists for Canada
Universiade bronze medalists for Canada
Medalists at the 1965 Summer Universiade
Medalists at the 1967 Summer Universiade
Medalists at the 1963 Pan American Games
Medalists at the 1967 Pan American Games
Medalists at the 1971 Pan American Games
Medalists at the 1975 Pan American Games
Medallists at the 1966 British Empire and Commonwealth Games